The 1941 Arizona State–Flagstaff Lumberjacks football team was an American football team that represented Arizona State Teachers College at Flagstaff (now known as Northern Arizona University) in the Border Conference during the 1941 college football season. In its second year under head coach Maurice Moulder, the team compiled a 3–5 record (1–5 against conference opponents) and was outscored by a total of 143 to 119.  The team played its home games at Skidmore Field in Flagstaff, Arizona.

End Don Snyder was selected by the conference coaches as a second-team player on the 1941 All-Border Conference football team.

Schedule

References

Arizona State-Flagstaff
Northern Arizona Lumberjacks football seasons
Arizona State-Flagstaff Lumberjacks football